This article gives an overview of liberalism in Greece. Liberal parties in Greece are largely committed to liberalism, republicanism and democracy. It is limited to liberal parties.

History
Each of the following sections describes an element of Greek liberalism, beginning with the 19th century.

From Modernist Party to the Center Union
1875: The Modernist Party (Neoteristikon Komma) is formed
1910: A resurrected Liberal Party (Komma Fileleftheron) is formed under Eleftherios Venizelos 
1935: Faction around Georgios Papandreou forms the Democratic Socialist Party of Greece
1936: All political parties are banned in Greece under Ioannis Metaxas' dictatorship, but a liberal movement remained present
1941: The Greek government in exile contains mostly liberal politicians
1946: Start of the Greek Civil War, lasting until 1949
1946: Liberal fraction led by Themistoklis Sophoulis continues under the Liberal Party name
1956: Liberal Party takes part in the elections of 1956 in the Liberal Democratic Union (Filelefthero Dimokratiko Kentro) coalition
1961: Liberal Party merges into the Centre Union

From Democratic Socialist Party to the Center Union
1935: A faction of the Liberal Party around Georgios Papandreou forms the Democratic Socialist Party of Greece
1936: All political parties are banned in Greece under Ioannis Metaxas' dictatorship, but a liberal movement remained present
1941: The Greek government in exile contains mostly liberal politicians
1946: Start of the Greek Civil War, lasting until 1949
1946: Liberal faction led by Georgios Papandreou is part of the National Political Union alliance
1949: National Progressive Union of the Centre (Ethniki Proodeutiki Enosis Kentrou, EPEK) is founded by Nikolaos Plastiras after the Greek Civil War and disappears in 1956. The remains of the party merged into Center Union.
1956: Liberal faction led by Georgios Papandreou is part of the Liberal Democratic Union coalition

From Center Union to Union of the Democratic Center
1961: Georgios Papandreou forms the Centre Union (Enosi Kentrou)
1965: Right-wing faction of the Center Union forms the short-lived Liberal Democratic Center
1967: Start of the Military Junta continuing until 1974
1968: Andreas Papandreou, son of Georgios Papandreou, forms the Panhellenic Liberation Movement which eventually becomes PASOK.
1974: Centre Union - New Forces (Enosi Kentrou-Nees Dynameis) is formed by George Mavros
1974: Ioannis Zigdis forms the Democratic Center Union which merges into the Union of the Democratic Centre in 1976
1976: Union of the Democratic Centre is formed as successor of the Centre Union - New Forces
1981: Nikitas Venizelos splits from Union of the Democratic Centre and revives the Liberal Party of his grandfather, which has participated in elections since.
2012: The Liberal Party vanished.

Party of New Liberals
1977: Constantine Mitsotakis forms the Party of New Liberals which merges into New Democracy in 1978

Union of Centrists
1990: Centre (Κέντρο) is founded by George G. Papandreou, son of Georgios Papandreou.
1992: Union of Centrists (Enosi Kentroon) is founded by Vassilis Leventis and by Centre.

The Liberals
1999: A short-lived libertarian party is founded by Stefanos Manos, The Liberals espousing a laissez-faire political platform, such as social liberal policies. The party was dissolved in October 2001. The party's founder cooperated with PASOK in 2004, after George Papandreou's invitation to be honorarily elected as member of the Greek parliament under PASOK's flag, and founded yet another party, "Drassi", in 2009, this time refusing to use the term "liberal" and claiming it was based upon "common sense".

Liberal Alliance
February 2007: Establishment of the Liberal Alliance, advocating economic and social liberal policies.

Liberal leaders

Liberal Party: Eleftherios Venizelos - Themistoklis Sophoulis - Sophoklis Venizelos
National Progressive Union of the Centre: Nikolaos Plastiras
Centre Union: Georgios Papandreou - George Mavros
Union of the Democratic Center: George Mavros - Ioannis Zigdis
Party of New Liberals: Constantine Mitsotakis

See also
 History of Greece
 Politics of Greece
 List of political parties in Greece
 Venizelism

 
Greece